The Nashville Predators are an American professional ice hockey team based in Nashville, Tennessee. They play in the Central Division of the Western Conference in the National Hockey League (NHL). The team joined the NHL in 1998 as an expansion team and have played their home games at the Bridgestone Arena since their inaugural season. David Poile has been the team's sole general manager since their inception. On February 26, 2023, it was announced Poile would retire from the position and that former head coach Barry Trotz would replace him effective July 1, 2023.

Key

General managers

Notes
 A running total of the number of general managers of the franchise. Thus any general manager who has two or more separate terms as general manager is only counted once.

See also
List of NHL general managers

References

 
Nashville Predators general managers
general managers